The 1877 Yale Bulldogs football team represented Yale University in the 1877 college football season. The team finished with a 3–0–1 record and was retroactively named national champion by the National Championship Foundation and co-national champion by Parke H. Davis.

Schedule

Standings

References

Yale
Yale Bulldogs football seasons
College football national champions
College football undefeated seasons
Yale Bulldogs football